Duruitoarea Nouă is a commune in Rîșcani District, Moldova. It is composed of two villages, Dumeni and Duruitoarea Nouă.

Gallery

References

Communes of Rîșcani District